Politics of Madagascar takes place in a framework of a semi-presidential representative democratic republic, whereby the President of Madagascar is head of state and the Prime Minister of Madagascar is head of government, and of a pluriform multi-party system. Executive power is exercised by the government. Legislative power is vested in both the government and the Senate and the National Assembly. The Judiciary is independent of the executive and the legislature.

Political history

Madagascar's first President, Philibert Tsiranana, was elected when his Social Democratic Party gained power at independence in 1960 and was reelected without opposition in March 1972. However, he resigned only 2 months later in response to massive anti-government demonstrations. The unrest continued, and Tsiranana's successor, Gen. Gabriel Ramanantsoa, resigned on February 5, 1975, handing over executive power to Lt. Col. Richard Ratsimandrava, who was assassinated 6 days later. A provisional military directorate then ruled until a new government was formed in June 1975, under Didier Ratsiraka.

During the 16 subsequent years of President Ratsiraka's rule, Madagascar continued under a government committed to revolutionary socialism based on the 1975 Constitution establishing a highly centralized state. During this period a strategy of nationalization of private enterprises, centralization of the economy and "Malgasization" of the education system crippled the economy, leaving traces even today of a highly centralized economic system and a high level of illiteracy. National elections in 1982 and 1989 returned Ratsiraka for a second and third 7-year presidential term. For much of this period, only limited and restrained political opposition was tolerated, with no direct criticism of the president permitted in the press.

With an easing of restrictions on political expression, beginning in the late 1980s, the Ratsiraka regime came under increasing pressure to make fundamental changes. In response to a deteriorating economy, Ratsiraka relaxed socialist economic policies and instituted some liberal, private-sector reforms. These, along with political reforms like the elimination of press censorship in 1989 and the formation of more political parties in 1990, were insufficient to placate a growing opposition movement known as Hery Velona ("Active Forces"). A number of already existing political parties and their leaders, among them Albert Zafy and Manandafy Rakotonirina, anchored this movement which was especially strong in Antananarivo and the surrounding high plateau.

In response to largely peaceful mass demonstrations and crippling general strikes, Ratsiraka replaced his prime minister in August 1991 but suffered an irreparable setback soon thereafter when his troops fired on peaceful demonstrators marching on Iavoloha, the suburban presidential palace, killing more than 30.

In an increasingly weakened position, Ratsiraka acceded to negotiations on the formation of a transitional government. The resulting "Panorama Convention" of October 31, 1991, stripped Ratsiraka of nearly all of his powers, created interim institutions, and set an 18-month timetable for completing a transition to a new form of constitutional government. The High Constitutional Court was retained as the ultimate judicial arbiter of the process.

In March 1992, a widely representative National Forum organized by the FFKM (Malagasy Christian Council of Churches) drafted a new Constitution. Troops guarding the proceedings clashed with pro-Ratsiraka "federalists" who tried to disrupt the forum in protest of draft constitutional provisions preventing the incumbent president from running again. The text of the new Constitution was put to a nationwide referendum in August 1992 and approved by a wide margin, despite efforts by federalists to disrupt balloting in several coastal areas.

Presidential elections were held on November 25, 1992, after the High Constitutional Court had ruled, over Hery Velona objections, that Ratsiraka could become a candidate. Runoff elections were held in February 1993, and the leader of the Hery Velona movement, Albert Zafy, defeated Ratsiraka. Zafy was sworn in as President on March 27, 1993. After President Zafy's impeachment by the National Assembly in 1996 and the short quasi-presidency of Norbert Ratsirahonana, the 1997 elections once again pitted Zafy and Ratsiraka, with Ratsiraka this time emerging victorious. A National Assembly dominated by members of President Ratsiraka'a political party AREMA subsequently passed the 1998 Constitution, which considerably strengthened the presidency.

In December 2001, a presidential election was held in which both major candidates claimed victory. The Ministry of the Interior declared incumbent Ratsiraka of the AREMA party victorious. Marc Ravalomanana contested the results and claimed victory. A political crisis followed in which Ratsiraka supporters cut major transport routes from the primary port city to the capital city, a stronghold of Ravalomanana support. Sporadic violence and considerable economic disruption continued until July 2002 when Ratsiraka and several of his prominent supporters fled to exile in France. In addition to political differences, ethnic differences played a role in the crisis and continue to play a role in politics. Ratsiraka is from the coastal Betsimisaraka tribe and Ravalomanana comes from the highland Merina tribe.

After the end of the 2002 political crisis, President Ravalomanana began many reform projects, forcefully advocating "rapid and durable development" and the launching of a battle against corruption. December 2002 legislative elections gave his newly formed TIM (Tiako-I-Madagasikara) (I Love Madagascar) Party a commanding majority in the National Assembly. November 2003 municipal elections were conducted freely, returning a majority of supporters of the president, but also significant numbers of independent and regional opposition figures.

Following the crisis of 2002, the President replaced provincial governors with appointed PDSs (Presidents des Delegations Speciales). Subsequent legislation established a structure of 22 regions to decentralize administration. In September 2004, the Government named 22 Regional Chiefs, reporting directly to the President, to implement its decentralization plans. Financing and specific powers for the regional administrations remain to be clarified.

After being re-elected in 2006, Ravalomanana's government was dissolved in March 2009, in a militarily-backed uprising led by Andry Rajoelina. Rajoelina formed a High Transitional Authority of which he was the 'Transitional Head of State'. So far he has held a referendum, in November 2010, to update the constitution. Despite an alleged coup during, this was approved, and new elections were scheduled to be held in July 2013.

The second round of the postponed presidential elections was held in December 2013 and the results were announced in January 2014. The winner and the next president was Hery Rajaonarimampianina. He was backed by Rajoelina who led the 2009 coup and still was very influential political figure. 

In 2018 the first round of the presidential election was held on 7 November and the second round was held on 10 December. Three former presidents and the most recent president were the main candidates of the elections. Former president Andry Rajoelina won the second round of the elections. He was previously president from 2009 to 2014. Former president Marc Ravalomana lost the second round and he did not accept the results because of allegations of fraud. Ravalomana was president from 2002 to 2009. The most recent president Hery Rajaonarimampianina received very modest support in the first round. In January 2019 the High Constitutional Court declared Rajoelina as the winner of the elections and the new president.    In June 2019 parliamentary elections the party of president Andry Rajoelina won absolute majority of the seats of the National Assembly. It received 84 seats and the supporters of former president Ravalomana got only 16 seats of 151 seats of the National Assembly. 51 seats of deputies were independent or represented small parties. President Rajoelina could rule as a strongman.

Executive branch

|President
|Andry Rajoelina
|Young Malagasies Determined
|19 January 2019
|-
|Prime Minister
|Christian Ntsay
|Independent
|6 June 2018
|}
The president is elected by direct universal suffrage for a 5-year term, renewable twice.
A Prime Minister and council of ministers carries out day-to-day management of government. The President appoints the Prime Minister. The Prime Minister and members of Parliament initiate legislation and the government executes it. The President can dissolve the National Assembly. For its part, the National Assembly can pass a motion of censure and require the Prime Minister and council of ministers to step down. The Constitutional Court approves the constitutionality of new laws.

Ministers 

 Serge Gelle, Police Minister

Legislative branch
The Parliament has two chambers. The National Assembly (Antenimieram-Pirenena/Assemblée Nationale) has 160 members, elected for a five-year term in single-member and two-member constituencies. The Senate (Sénat) has 33 members; 22 are indirectly elected, one from each of the 22 regions of Madagascar, and 11 are appointed by the President.

Political parties and elections

Presidential elections

Parliamentary elections

Administrative divisions
Territorial administration is to be determined by legislation. In an effort to decentralize administration, the constitution calls for the six provinces (faritany) to become autonomous. The provinces are Antananarivo, Antsiranana, Fianarantsoa, Mahajanga, Toamasina, Toliara.

International organization participation
ACCT, ACP, AfDB, ECA, FAO, G-77, IAEA, IBRD, ICAO, ICC, ICFTU, ICRM, IDA, IFAD, IFC, IFRCS, ILO, IMF, IMO, InOC, Intelsat, Interpol, IOC, IOM (observer), ISO (correspondent), ITU, NAM, OAU, OPCW, UN, UNCTAD, UNESCO, UNHCR, UNIDO, UPU, WCL, WCO, WFTU, WHO, WIPO, WMO, WToO, WTrO

Notable people
 

 Pierre Ramampy, politician
 Roseline Emma Rasolovoahangy, candidante for president

References

External links
  Madagascar Official Government Portal
  List of names and websites of government institutions of Madagascar

Politics of Madagascar